William de la Corner was a medieval Bishop of Salisbury, who fought a long but unsuccessful battle to become Archbishop of Dublin.

Biography
Corner was a papal chaplain and proctor as well as a royal envoy. He successively held the offices of prebendary of Teinton Regis and Highworth in the diocese of Salisbury, precentor of the diocese of York, Archdeacon of Glendalough and archdeacon of Northumberland.

In 1271, on the death of Fulk Basset, Corner was nominated as Archbishop of Dublin, but faced a rival candidate in Fromund Le Brun, the Lord Chancellor of Ireland: the result was a long and bitter struggle for the office, which required the personal intervention of the Pope, and ended in 1279  with both candidates being disqualified in favour of John de Derlington (although Derlington, detained in England on official business, died without reaching Ireland). 

Corner was an unsuccessful candidate for the bishopric of Salisbury in March 1288, losing out to Lawrence de Awkeburne. After Lawrence's death, William was elected on 24 November 1288 and consecrated on 8 May 1289.

Corner died in October 1291, probably on the 10th.

Citations

References
 British History Online Bishops of Salisbury accessed on 30 October 2007
 

Bishops of Salisbury
Archdeacons of Northumberland
13th-century English Roman Catholic bishops
1291 deaths
Year of birth unknown
Archdeacons of Glendalough